Erica Jasmin Mena (born November 8, 1987) is an American television personality, model, and video vixen. She is best known for her appearances on Love & Hip Hop: New York and Love & Hip Hop: Atlanta, appearing in the franchise since 2011.

Career
Mena first gained notoriety as a model and "video vixen", through her appearances in various hip hop music videos, for artists such as Chris Brown, Fabolous, Akon and Fat Joe. She became known to a larger audience through her reality television appearances, including Kourtney & Khloe Take Miami and Love & Hip Hop: New York, the original installment of the Love & Hip Hop franchise.  She has also embarked on a career as an author, releasing the autobiographies Chronicles of a Confirmed Bachelorette and Underneath It All.  In August 2017, it was announced that Mena would compete in the first season of VH1's Scared Famous, which premiered on October 23, 2017. In 2018, Erica joined the cast of Love & Hip Hop: Atlanta for the seventh season. In 2019, she returned to Love & Hip Hop: New York for its tenth anniversary season.

Personal life
Mena is openly bisexual. Mena is of Puerto Rican and Dominican  ancestry. She graduated from Newburgh Free Academy in Newburgh, NY. She has a son, King Javien Conde (born March 1, 2007) with video director and rapper Raul Conde, a member of Fat Joe's Terror Squad.

Mena was previously engaged to Bow Wow. On December 24, 2018, Mena became engaged to rapper and television personality Safaree Samuels. On October 1, 2019, she announced that she and Samuels were expecting their first child together. On October 7, 2019, she and Samuels married at the Legacy Castle in New Jersey. Their daughter was born in 2020. On May 4, 2021, she announced that she and Samuels were expecting their second child together. On May 25, 2021, TMZ reported that Mena officially filed for divorce from Samuels. Their son was born in 2021.

Legal issues
On October 12, 2018, Mena and boyfriend Clifford Dixon were arrested at Mena's Johns Creek, Georgia residence for a domestic dispute, with Dixon charged with criminal trespass and Mena charged with marijuana possession. The police were called when roommates were disturbed by the commotion upstairs when Dixon kicked down a bedroom door that Mena had locked to barricade herself. Both were released when posting bail.

Filmography

Television

References

External links

1987 births
Living people
People from the Bronx
American people of Puerto Rican descent
American socialites
Participants in American reality television series
American people of Dominican Republic descent
Hip hop models
LGBT Hispanic and Latino American people
Bisexual women
Models from New York City